Ernest William Bussey  (9 December 1891 – 16 July 1958) was a British trade union leader.

Bussey grew up in West Ham and qualified as an electrical engineer.  He worked for the West Ham Corporation, then for London County Council.  He also became active in the Electrical Trades Union (ETU), and in 1931 was elected as its General President.

In 1941, the ETU's longstanding General Secretary, Jimmy Rowan, retired.  Bussey was elected as his replacement, and also took over Rowan's place on the General Council of the Trades Union Congress.  In his obituary, Walter Citrine noted that "he never pandered to the more ardently militant section" of the union.  

Bussey stood down from his trade union posts at the end of 1946 to join the British Electricity Authority, and was also made a Commander of the Order of the British Empire.  From 1952, he was the chair of the Joint Negotiating Committee for the electricity industry.  He retired in 1956, and died two years later.

References

1891 births
1958 deaths
General Presidents of the Electrical Trades Union (United Kingdom)
General Secretaries of the Electrical Trades Union (United Kingdom)
Members of the General Council of the Trades Union Congress
People from West Ham